Sergey Alimovich Melikov (born 12 September 1965), is a Russian statesman and military leader, who has served as the 5th Head of the Republic of Dagestan since 14 October 2021.

Melikov was a Senator from Stavropol Krai, from 2019 to 2020, representing from the executive power in office. He was First Deputy Director of the Federal Service of the Russian National Guard, and the Commander-in-Chief of the Russian National Guard troops from 2016 to 2019. Melikov was also the Plenipotentiary Envoy of the North Caucasian Federal District from 2014 to 2016.

Melikov is a Colonel General as of 2022.

Biography

Early life 
Sergey Melikov was born on 12 September 1965 in the town of Orekhovo-Zuyevo near Moscow, to a family of service members.

Military career

In 1986, Melikov graduated from the Saratov Higher Military Command Red Banner School of Internal Troops named after F. E. Dzerzhinsky with a degree in intelligence. After graduating, he was assigned as an officer for military service in a separate brigade of the Directorate of Internal Troops of the USSR Ministry of Internal Affairs in the Ukrainian SSR and the Moldovian SSR, served in Lvov, and Odessa, from the school. He was a member of the Communist Party. In 1994, he graduated from the Faculty of Border and Internal Troops of the Frunze Military Academy.

Between 1994 and 1996, Melikov served in the First Chechen War. From 1994 to 1995, he held the positions of senior assistant chief of staff of the regiment, and then battalion commander of the operational division. Since 1995, he has been a senior officer of the military intelligence section of the headquarters intelligence department. In 1996, he was appointed chief of staff and a deputy commander of the operational regiment of the operational division until 1997. In 1997, he was appointed deputy commander, and in 1998, he was promoted to commander of the 2nd regiment of the Separate operational division of the internal troops of the Ministry of Internal Affairs.

In March 2001, he took up the post of deputy commander of this division. In June 2002, he became its commander.

After completing his studies, Melikov was transferred to the North Caucasus District with the Internal Troops of the Ministry of Internal Affairs. In April 2008, he was appointed Chief of Staff, and First Deputy Commander of the Central Regional Command of the Internal Troops of the Ministry of Internal Affairs.

On 31 August 2011, Melikov graduated from the Military Academy of the General Staff of the Russian Armed Forces. On the same day, by decree of the President of Russia, he was appointed commander of the Joint Group of Forces (forces) for conducting counter-terrorist operations in the North Caucasus region of the Russian Federation as the First Deputy Commander of the North Caucasus Caucasian Regional Command of Internal Troops of the Ministry of Internal Affairs.

On 8 May 2014, Melikov was appointed First Deputy Chief of the Main Staff of the Internal Troops of the Ministry of Internal Affairs. The headquarters was headed by Colonel-General Sergey Bunin.

Plenipotentiary Representative of the North Caucasus Federal District

On 12 May 2014, Melikov was appointed Plenipotentiary Representative of the North Caucasus Federal District. On the same day, he was added to the Security Council of the Russian Federation by presidential decree. The following month, Melikov was dismissed from military service with official date of his discharge being the day of his appointment as Plenipotentiary Representative, with the rank of lieutenant general. He was also awarded the rank of State Councilor of the Russian Federation, 1st class.

On 28 July 2016, Melikov was relieved of his post as Plenipotentiary Representative and was appointed First Deputy Director of the Federal Service of the National Guard Troops of the Russian Federation and a Commander-in-Chief of the Russian national guard.  By presidential decree of 12 August, his membership of the Security Council was revoked.

Service in the National Guard

On 26 August 2016, by decree of the President of the Russian, Melikov was awarded the military rank of Colonel General.

In 2017, RBC reported in speculation that Melikov was considered by the head of the Republic of Dagestan.

In June 2019, he submitted his resignation from the post of First Deputy Director of the Federal Service of the Russian National Guard.

Return to public service

On 27 September 2019, the Governor of Stavropol Krai, Vladimir Vladimirov, appointed Melikov as Senator of the Federation Council from Stavropol Krai.  On 5 October 2020, the powers were terminated as Melikov, by decree of the President of Russia, was appointed Acting Head of the Republic of Dagestan. On 14 October 2021, the parliament of Dagestan elected him as the 5th Head of Dagestan.

He was a member of the Board of Trustees of the Hero of Russia Foundation Colonel General Anatoly Romanov.

Personal life

Melikov is an ethnic Lezgin, born to a native father, and a Russian mother. His father, Alim Nur-Magomedovich (1932-2012), was a retired colonel, commander of a brigade of internal troops of the USSR Ministry of Internal Affairs. His mother, Tatyana Nikolayevna, was a teacher.

His older brother, Mikhail, (born 2 February 1958), is a major general in reserve, who graduated from the Leningrad Combined Arms Command School, and served in various positions up to battalion commander in the Airborne Forces. Mikhail was later transferred to the Internal Troops of the Ministry of Internal Affairs, as he commanded a regiment of Internal Troops in Yaroslavl. From 1998 to 1999, he was the commander of the 1st Operational Regiment of the Separate Operational Division of the Internal Troops of the Ministry of Internal Affairs. From 1999 to 2001, Mikhail Melikov was the commander of the 1st Special Purpose Regiment "Vityaz" of the Internal Troops of the Ministry of Internal Affairs, chairman of the public organization of veterans of special forces an operational division of the Internal Troops of the Ministry of Internal Affairs in Novocherkassk.

Sergey's wife, Galina Melikova, is a military doctor. Their son, Mikhail, studied at the Military University of the Ministry of Defence as of July 2018. Their stepson, Dmitry Serkov (1981 - 2 August 2007), served in the 1st Red Banner Special Forces "Vityaz", was the commander of the assault group of the 1st platoon of the 1st group of the unit. Serkov died on 2 August 2007 in Dagestan during a combat mission. In December 2007, Serkov was posthumously awarded the title of Hero of the Russian Federation.

References

External links

1965 births
Living people
1st class Active State Councillors of the Russian Federation
Dagestani politicians
Russian people of Lezgian descent
Members of the Federation Council of Russia (after 2000)
Heads of the Republic of Dagestan